Mirror of Deception is German doom metal band, formed in 1990.

Biography

Along with Dawn of Winter, Mirror of Deception is Germany's longest running traditional doom act. The band was formed by guitarist Jochen Fopp (also founder and owner of the Doom Shall Rise festival) and guitarist/vocalist Michael Siffermann.

Mirror of Deception were unsigned during the 90s (except when releasing the EP titled Veil of Lead), they achieved cult underground status in their homeland. Demos recorded during this time were later released on the Past & Present compilation.

Their debut album Mirrorsoil was released 2001. After its release and tour, Mirror of Deception parted ways with original singer Markus Baumhauer, being replaced by guitarist Michael Siffermann. The band soon got signed to Richard Walker's (ex- Sore Throat, Solstice) label The Miskatonic Foundation and in 2003 released the EP Conversion.

Discography

Albums
 Mirrorsoil, 2001 (Iron Glory)
 Foregone, 2004 (Final Chapter)
 Shards, 2006 (Cyclone Empire)
 A Smouldering Fire, 2010
 The Estuary, 2018 (End Of Green)

EPs
 Veil Of Lead, 1997 (Sub Zero)
 Conversion, 2003 (The Miskatonic Foundation)
 Imperial Anthems split single: Pagan Altar - Portrait of Dorian Gray / Mirror of Deception - Beltaine's Joy, 2011 (Cyclone Empire)

Demos
 Mirror of Deception, 1993
 Words Unspoken, 1994
 Cease, 1996
 Veil Of Lead, 1996
 The Float Sessions, 1997

Compilations
 Past & Present, 2001 (self-released)

References

External links
 Official website
 

German doom metal musical groups
Musical groups established in 1990
Musical quartets